Ahmed Mohiuddin (born 10 October 1898, date of death unknown) was an Indian politician and the Member of parliament from 1952 to 1962 from the Secunderabad, Lok Sabha constituency of Hyderabad. He was elected twice during the first Lok Sabha and the second Lok Sabha elections which were the India's first and the second general elections held in 1951 and 1957 after the Independence.

Education background
Mohiuddin was born on 10 October 1898 in Hyderabad city of Andhra Pradesh. He did his Bachelor of Arts from the University of Cambridge, also abbreviated as "B. A. (Cantab)". Besides completing B.A from England, He had also studied at the Aligarh Muslim University in Uttar Pradesh.

Career background
Ahmed Mohiuddin was originally a retired government servant and the member of Indian Institute of Economics unit Hyderabad. He had served in the Nation Building Department and Professor of Economics, at Nizam College, Hyderabad from 1927 — 1930. He had also served as the Member-secretary in Banking Inquiry Committee, 1929, Co-operative Finance Inquiry Committee, and Director at the Commerce and Industry unit Hyderabad from 1938 — 1943. Appointed by Congress in 1939,
He represented his hometown on the National Planning Committee. Besides serving in several departments with different positions, He served in Hyderabad State Bank and later, Secretary at Labour department from 1949 - 1950.

Ahmed since then was elected Member of parliament of the First Lok Sabha (1952—57) and then re-elected in the Second Lok Sabha elections (1957 — 1962). During his political spanning, He served as the Deputy Minister of Civil Aviation from 1958 — 1962 and then Deputy Minister of Transport and Communications since 1962.

Personal life
Ahmed was married to Aisha Sultana, with whome he had one daughter and two sons.

References 

1898 births
Year of death missing
India MPs 1952–1957
India MPs 1957–1962
People from Hyderabad, India
Indian politicians